Cedar Lake is an unincorporated community and census-designated place (CDP) in Canadian County, Oklahoma, United States. It was first listed as a CDP prior to the 2020 census.

The CDP is in southwestern Canadian County, built around Cedar Lake, a reservoir.

Demographics

References 

Census-designated places in Canadian County, Oklahoma
Census-designated places in Oklahoma